The 2020 Himachal Football League was the 1st season of the Himachal Football League, the top-tier league in the Indian state Himachal Pradesh, organised by Himachal Pradesh Football Association (HPFA).

The inaugural season kicked off on the 25 November 2020, with 10 teams competing for the maiden title. The 10 teams were divided into two groups of 5, with the table toppers from each group advancing to the final.

Teams
A total of 10 teams participated in the league.

League table

Group A

Group B

Final
Himachal FC from group B were the first team to enter final of the inaugural edition of Himachal Football League.

References

Football in Himachal Pradesh
2020–21 in Indian football leagues